Robert Dow may refer to:
Robert Michael Dow Jr. (born 1965), United States federal judge
Robert Dow (fencer) (born 1945), American Olympic fencer
Robert Dow (music copyist) (1553–1588), English Renaissance academic from Oxford, author of the Dow Partbooks
Robert Dow (poet), American poet with a work included in The Best American Poetry 1997
Rob Dow, head coach of the Vermont Catamounts men's soccer team